The Convict of Cayenne (German: Der Sträfling von Cayenne) is a 1921 German silent drama film directed by Léo Lasko and starring Frederic Zelnik and Loni Nest. It premiered in Berlin at the Marmorhaus.

Cast
In alphabetical order
 Julius Falkenstein
 Loni Nest
 Heinrich Peer
 Charles Puffy
 Albert Steinrück
 Emmy Sturm
 Herma van Delden
 Frederic Zelnik

References

Bibliography
 Bock, Hans-Michael & Bergfelder, Tim. The Concise CineGraph. Encyclopedia of German Cinema. Berghahn Books, 2009.

External links

1921 films
Films of the Weimar Republic
German silent feature films
Films directed by Léo Lasko
German black-and-white films
German drama films
1921 drama films
Silent drama films
1920s German films
1920s German-language films